Frank John Ford  (18 March 1935 – 27 September 2018) was an Australian freelance writer, director, dramaturg and drama lecturer.

Biography
He studied acting, drama theory, dramaturgy, directing and cinema in his degrees: M.F.A. (Theatre Arts) from Columbia University, New York (Awarded the Richard Rodgers Scholarship); Certificate in Arts Administration, Harvard Business School; A.D.B (Associate of the Drama Board) London and B.A. University of Sydney.

He was an author and director of opera, music theatre, cabaret, experimental theatre, modern and classic drama and multi-media productions. His plays, adaptations and cabarets have been performed in Australia and overseas. He was former Head of the Department of Drama at Adelaide University and held various teaching, directing and arts administration positions here and overseas.

He was Founding Chair of the art festival Adelaide Fringe Festival in 1975, and its first Honorary Life Member. He initiated the Adelaide Cabaret Festival and was Chair of the Advisory Committee. He served on many arts boards such as Country Arts SA, Adelaide Festival and as Chair of the Australian Dance Theatre and was in later life Chair of the Independent Arts Foundation.

He died on 27 September 2018 at the age of 83.

Honours and legacy
Honorary Life Member of Adelaide Fringe.
In 1999, he was awarded Member of the Order of Australia for service to the development of the performing arts in South Australia as a director, playwright, administrator and educator. In 2001 he received the Centenary Medal for services to the community, particularly through the performing arts. 
In 2006 he received the inaugural Premier’s "Life Time Achievement" Ruby Award for the Arts.
In 2015 was an Australia Day, South Australian Senior of the Year Finalist and City of Adelaide Citizen of the Year.
In 2017 he was appointed Honorary Membership, Actors Equity division of the Media Entertainment and Arts Alliance.
In 2018 the South Australian Ruby Awards named an award after him, the Frank Ford Memorial Young Achiever Award

References

1935 births
2018 deaths
Australian theatre directors
Academic staff of the University of Adelaide
Australian LGBT dramatists and playwrights
Members of the Order of Australia
University of Sydney alumni
Columbia University School of the Arts alumni
Harvard Business School alumni
Australian male dramatists and playwrights

Further reading